"Marrakech" was released as the first single from ATB's album No Silence. The vocals in the song were provided by Tiff Lacey, who also lent her voice to the album's second single, "Ecstasy." Marrakech was featured in the European soundtrack for the movie Mindhunters, and it can be heard during the film's ending credits and in some of its promotional trailers.

CD single track listings

Marrakech (Germany Release) 
 "Marrakech" (Airplay Mix) 3:47
 "Marrakech" (A & T Remix) 8:37
 "Marrakech" (Clubb Mix) 11:18
 "Marrakech" (Revolution Mix) 9:16

Marrakech (US Release)
 "Marrakech" (Airplay Mix) 3:45
 "Marrakech" (A&T Remix) 8:35
 "Marrakech" (Clubb Mix) 11:17
 "Marrakech" (Live @ Nowhere Mix) 11:30
 "Marrakech" (Revolution Mix) 9:16

Charts

2004 singles
ATB songs
Songs written by André Tanneberger
2004 songs
Kontor Records singles
Songs written by Bruce Elliott-Smith